Rachel Yoder is an American writer from Iowa City, Iowa, best known for her novel Nightbitch.

Life and career

Yoder grew up in an intentional Mennonite community in Ohio, before attending the University of Iowa Non-Fiction writing program and earning an MFA from the University of Arizona. She is the founder of draft: the journal of process. In 2021, she released her debut novel Nightbitch, which was a "best book of the year" in Esquire and Vulture and a finalist for the PEN/Hemingway Award for Debut Fiction, among other awards.

References

External links
 Official site

American writers
American Mennonites
Living people
Mennonite writers
Writers from Iowa
Writers from Ohio
University of Arizona alumni
University of Iowa alumni
Year of birth missing (living people)